South Shore High School is one of the two defunct New York City public high schools in Canarsie, Brooklyn, the other being Canarsie High School. Opened in 1970, it had a capacity of 4000 students in grades nine through twelve. At the peak of enrollment, during the 1972-74 school years, the comprehensive high school had a student population of 6,800, making South Shore the second largest high school in the United States at the time. To accommodate the large capacity of students 13 class periods were provided. The freshmen and sophomores were accommodated in the afternoon–early evening, while juniors and seniors were instructed in the early to late morning. An evening adult education center opened in 1973.

South Shore High School participated in City University of New York's College Now program, which provided senior-year students the opportunity to take courses for college credit on the high school campus. The program was run in cooperation with Kingsborough Community College.

While South Shore High was relatively problem-free through the 1970s and most of the 1980s, there were a few incidents, particularly during the 1970–71 school year, starting with interracial fighting in the opening month of school. Several student riots occurred during that opening year,
forcing its first principal, Max Bromer, to resign. A riot occurred outside the school on the last day of classes in June 1987; one student was shot to death off campus in May 1990; in July 1990 a student was shot right outside the school in the rotunda and died in the hospital five days later. Another student was stabbed to death in a stairwell in September 1992.

Because of increasing security problems, South Shore High School is now closed and its final class graduated in June 2014. Five smaller schools are now operating on the campus: Brooklyn Theater Arts High School, Brooklyn Bridge Academy, Brooklyn Generation School, Victory Collegiate High School and, Academy for Conservation and the Environment, as well as the South Shore Young Adult Borough Center (YABC), an alternative high school evening program and a charter school, making a total of seven schools in the building.

The Brooklyn Comprehensive Night High School operated on the campus of South Shore High School beginning in 1970, but was closed in 2014.

Notable alumni

 Alisha, (b 1968) American freestyle and dance-pop singer.
 Troy Ave, (b 1985), American rapper.
 Ill Bill, (b 1972), American rapper and record producer.
 Michael De Luca, (b 1965) Academy Awards nominated film studio executive, film producer and screenwriter.
 Vic Dibitetto, (b 1961) American stand-up comedian, Internet personality, and actor. 
 Wayne Rosenthal,(b 1965) former Major League Baseball pitcher and pitching coach.
 Annabella Sciorra, (b 1960) actress and producer.
 Darren Phillip, (b 1978) professional basketball player.
 Travis Tucker, (b 1963) NFL tight end who played three seasons for the Cleveland Browns.

References

http://schools.nyc.gov/SchoolPortals/27/Q253/default.htm

External links

NYC Department of Education: South Shore High School
NYC Department of Education: Brooklyn Bridge Academy
NYC Department of Education: Brooklyn Generation School
NYC Department of Education: Brooklyn Theatre Arts High School
NYC Department of Education: Victory Collegiate High School
NYC Department of Education: Academy for Conservation and the Environment

Defunct high schools in Brooklyn
Educational institutions established in 1970
Canarsie, Brooklyn
Public high schools in Brooklyn